The Vijay for Best Supporting Actor is given by STAR Vijay as part of its annual Vijay Awards ceremony for Tamil  (Kollywood) films.

The list
Here is a list of the award winners and the films for which they won.

Nominations
2007 Prakash Raj - Mozhi
M. S. Bhaskar - Mozhi
Murali - Polladhavan
Rajkiran - Kireedam
Saravanan - Paruthiveeran
2008 Ajmal Ameer - Anjathey
Kumaravel - Abhiyum Naanum 
Prakash Raj - Abhiyum Naanum 
Sasikumar - Subramaniyapuram
2009 Jayaprakash - Pasanga
Bharani - Naadodigal
Jegan - Ayan
Krishnamoorthy - Naan Kadavul
Mohanlal - Unnaipol Oruvan
2010 Thambi Ramaiah - Mynaa
Ganesh - Vinnaithaandi Varuvaayaa
Madhavan - Manmadan Ambu
Parthiban - Aayirathil Oruvan
Sampath Raj - Goa
2011 R. Sarathkumar - Muni 2: Kanchana
Azhagarsamiyin Kuthirai - Appukutty
Ajmal Ameer - Ko
G. M. Kumar - Avan Ivan
Guru Somasundaram - Aaranya Kaandam
 2012 Sathyaraj - Nanban
Marimuthu  - Aarohanam
Naren - Sundarapandian
Pasupathi - Aravaan
Samuthirakani - Saattai
 2013 Bharathiraja - Pandiya Naadu
 Arvind Swamy - Kadal
 Karunakaran - Soodhu Kavvum
 Sathyaraj - Raja Rani
 Simha - Neram
 2014 Kalaiyarasan - Madras
Guru Somasundaram - Jigarthanda
Radharavi - Pisaasu
Rajkiran - Manjapai
Samuthirakani - Velaiyilla Pattathari

See also
 Tamil cinema
 Cinema of India

References

Supporting Actor